State Trunk Highway 97 (often called Highway 97, STH-97 or WIS 97) is a state highway in the U.S. state of Wisconsin.

Route description

WIS 97 starts at the intersection of WIS 13 and heads northeast. The road continues as Central Avenue southwest of the intersection and is signed as a special route of WIS 13. The highway then heads north and runs straight through Stratford as Weber Avenue and intersects WIS 153. It then goes through a diamond interchange with WIS 29 near Wuertsburg, then continues due North towards Athens. It then makes a right turn and then heads north again crossing Black Creek. The route then merges with CTH-F and heads west and then continues north after splitting with CTH-F until terminating at WIS 64 west of Goodrich. The road continues north as Mink Drive and becomes a dirt road.

Future
The Wisconsin Department of Transportation (WisDOT) plans to reconstruct the stretch between Northridge Street in Marshfield to Reflection Street in Stratford to increase traffic safety along the stretch. There were approximately 216 crashes that took place in that stretch between 2012 and 2016. The construction involves replacing the existing asphalt, widening the shoulders and adding rumble strips, replacing the guardrail and deteriorated culvert pipes, and modify the intersections of CTH-AAA, Galvin Road, Staadt Avenue, and CTH-C by widening and adding left turn lanes to separate turning traffic from thru traffic. The construction is anticipated to begin in 2022.

Major intersections

See also

References

External links

097
Transportation in Wood County, Wisconsin
Transportation in Marathon County, Wisconsin
Transportation in Taylor County, Wisconsin